Issime (Issime ; ; Valdôtain:  (locally )) is a town and comune in the Aosta Valley region of north-western Italy. Its population speak Walser German.

References

Cities and towns in Aosta Valley